Tamaz Mchedlidze (born 17 March 1993 in Georgia) is a Georgian rugby union player who plays for Rouen Normandie Rugby in the Pro D2. He plays at wing and centre and is able to cover the back row.

Club career
Mchedlidze began his rugby career in Tbilisi with the club 'Universiteti'. He then played for the Georgian Premiership team Armia Tbilisi. In 2012, he joined the Top 14 side Stade Montois and played in five European Challenge Cup games and one Top 14 game during the season. The following year, he joined Union Sportive Bressane, who had just been promoted to the Pro D2. Mchedlidze played 14 games for the team, but the team was relegated. Mchedlidze joined Agen during summer 2014.

International career
Mchedlidze made his debut for the Georgia national team against Belgium on 2 February 2013 during the European Nations Cup. He scored his first two international tries on 9 March 2013 against Spain.

References

External links
 http://www.espnscrum.com/statsguru/rugby/player/170949.html
 http://www.ladepeche.fr/article/2014/02/06/1812104-agen-l-inconnu-mchedlidze-entre-dans-l-equation.html
 http://www.lnr.fr/tamaz-mchedlidze,14644.html

1993 births
Living people
Rugby union centres
Rugby union players from Georgia (country)
Expatriate rugby union players from Georgia (country)
Expatriate rugby union players in France
Expatriate sportspeople from Georgia (country) in France
Rugby union players from Tbilisi
Georgia international rugby union players